Lasht-e Nesha (also Romanized as Lasht-e Neshā’, Lactneca, Lashteneshā, Lashtinishāh, Lashtinshakh, Lasht Neshā’, and Lasht Neshah; also known as Jowrshar, Jowrshar Sarbāzār, and Z̄ālīdān Chīk) is a city and capital of Lasht-e Nesha District, in Rasht County, Gilan Province, Iran.  At the 2006 census, its population was 10,871, in 3,270 families.

Situation

Lasht-e Nesha is located near the Caspian Sea and surrounded with rice fields. The city has an area of 5.23 square kilometers. It is about 30 kilometers away from the capital of Gilan, Rasht. Lasht-e Nesha is one of the oldest cities of Gilan; its history dates back to before the presence of Islam in the region. The town takes its name from a local legend. According to this legend, a long time ago, this area was ruled by a barbaric governor named Marvan who treated his people cruelly. On a spring day, Marvan and his men were inspecting the rice fields while women farmers were working and planting rice seeds. They were attacked by women farmers for their harassment. Marvan was killed and his body was planted under the clay soils of the rice field. Since then this area became known as Lasht-e Nesha (the planted corpse).

References

Populated places in Rasht County
Cities in Gilan Province